HMS Cromer is a Sandown-class minehunter commissioned by the Royal Navy in 1992. She was named after the North Norfolk seaside town of the same name.

HMS Cromer visited Dundee on 6–9 November 1998 (for a Dundee navy day and Armistice Day commemorations) when she was accompanied by various warships from European countries including: Norwegian minelayer/command ship KNM Vidar, Norwegian minesweeper KNM Måløy, Dutch minehunter M 860 Hr.Ms. Schiedam, Belgian minehunter Crocus, Type 23 frigate HMS Montrose and German minesweeper Volkingen.

She was decommissioned in 2001 before being refitted for use as a training ship at the Britannia Royal Naval College at Dartmouth. In keeping with tradition, for this role the ship has been renamed Hindostan. As she is not a commissioned ship she is not prefixed "HMS".

References 

Sandown-class minehunters
Ships built in Southampton
1990 ships